The Great Wrath (in contemporary sources: , 'Era of Russian domination/supremacy') was a period of Finnish history dominated by the Russian invasion and subsequent military occupation of Finland, then part of the Swedish Empire, from 1714 until the treaty of Nystad (1721), which ended the Great Northern War.

Background

Finland was left largely to fend for itself after the disaster of Poltava in 1709. Russia captured Viborg in 1710 and had by 1712 already started their first campaign to capture Finland, which ended in failure. A more organized campaign starting in 1713 managed to capture Helsinki/Helsingfors and drive defending Swedes away from the coast. The Swedish army in Finland was defeated in Storkyro (Isokyrö) in February 1714 with a decisive Russian victory. Swedish efforts to hinder the Russian advance by blockading the coastal sea route at Hangö ended in failure in late July at the battle of Gangut. The presence of a Russian galley fleet in the Gulf of Bothnia forced, in the end, both the Swedish fleet and army to largely abandon Finland in late 1714. Even the Swedish areas on the western side of the Gulf of Bothnia were ravaged by the Russians. The city of Umeå was burned to the ground by the Russians on 18 September 1714, and after struggling to rebuild was razed again in 1720, 1721, and 1722.

Russian occupation of Finland

After the victory of the Battle of Storkyro, Mikhail Golitsyn was appointed the governor of Finland. Finns began waging partisan warfare against the Russians. As retaliation, the Finnish peasants were forced to pay large contributions to the occupying Russians (as was the custom at the time). Plundering and raping were widespread, especially in Ostrobothnia and in communities near the major roads. Churches were looted and Isokyrö was burned to the ground. A scorched-earth zone several hundred kilometers wide was created by the Russians to hinder Swedish counteroffensives. At least 5,000 Finns were killed and some 10,000 taken away as slaves, of whom only a few thousand would ever return; according to more recent research, the number of the casualties would have been closer to 20,000. Recent research also estimates the number of enslaved children and women to have been closer to 30,000. The worst of these massacres took place on September 29, 1714, when during one night, the Cossacks killed about 800 inhabitants of the Hailuoto Island with axes. Thousands, especially officials, fled to the (relative) safety of Sweden. The poorer peasants hid in the woods to avoid the ravages of the occupiers and their press-gangs. Atrocities were at their worst between 1714 and 1717 when the Swedish Count Gustaf Otto Douglas, who had defected to the Russian side during the war, was in charge of the occupation.

In addition to the predation of the Russian occupants, Finland was struck – as were most other Baltic countries at the time – by the plague. In Helsinki, 1,185 people died: nearly two-thirds of the city's population. The plague had already struck Finland before the Russian invasion, sapping the strength of Sweden in Finland.

Consequences

It took several decades for the Finnish population and economy to recover after the peace in 1721, at which point Finland was scourged again during the war of 1741–1743, although less devastatingly.

See also
 Lesser Wrath, Russian occupation of Finland during the 1741–1743 war

References

Bibliography

 Svenska slagfält, 2003, (Wahlström & Widstrand)

18th century in Finland
Great Northern War
1710s in Europe
Looting